Paul Wade (born 17 April 2000) is a French professional footballer who plays for Nice II as a midfielder.

Career
Wade is a youth product of OGC Nice, having joined at the age of 13 from ASCC Football. He made his professional debut for Nice in a 1–0 Ligue 1 win against Lyon on 10 February 2019 coming on for Allan Saint-Maximin in the 83rd minute.

Career statistics

Club

References

External links
 Nice profile

Living people
2000 births
People from Cagnes-sur-Mer
Association football forwards
French footballers
OGC Nice players
Ligue 1 players
Sportspeople from Alpes-Maritimes
Footballers from Provence-Alpes-Côte d'Azur